HBC or HbC may refer to:

Companies and organizations
 Halton Borough Council, England
 Hellenic Broadcasting Corporation, the state-owned radio and television broadcaster for Greece
 Hokkaido Broadcasting, Japan
 Houston Boychoir, Texas, US
 HSBC Bank Canada
 Hudson's Bay Company, Canada
 Hummelstown Brownstone Company, US

Sports
 Harvard Boxing Club, a student organization at Harvard University, US
 HB Chartres, a French association football club
 Hyderabad Bicycling Club, India

Science and technology
 Hemoglobin C (HbC), an abnormal hemoglobin
 Hexabenzocoronene, a polycyclic aromatic hydrocarbon
 Hormonal birth control, a contraceptive
 Human-based computation, a computer science technique
 High breaking capacity, a type of electrical fuse
 HBC, a grade of hexagonal boron nitride

Other uses
 Haebangchon, a neighborhood in Seoul, South Korea
 Homebrew Channel, application for Nintendo Wii
 Harvey's Bristol Cream
 Head Ball Coach, nickname of retired college football coach Steve Spurrier
 Helena Bonham Carter (born 1966), actress
Historically black college (see HBCU).

See also
 Historically black colleges and universities (HBCU)
 HSBC (disambiguation)